A Virtual Customer Environment (VCE) is a web forum to facilitate customer co-innovation or user innovation.

Customers can partner with companies in different phases of product (or service) innovation - in product ideation, in product design & development, in product testing, and in product diffusion. VCEs can be designed so as to facilitate these different customer co-innovation roles. Examples of customer co-innovation through VCEs include Microsoft and the MVP forum; Nokia and the Concept Lounge; Ducati and the Tech Cafe; etc.

The term 'Virtual Customer Environment' was introduced by Satish Nambisan of Rensselaer Polytechnic Institute.

Research published in MIT Sloan Management Review in 2008 focused on customer experience in such virtual customer environments and how companies can establish their VCEs so as to provide positive customer experiences in value co-creation.

See also
 Ideas bank
 Crowdsourcing
 Innovation management
 Wisdom of crowds

References 

General
Sawhney, M., G. Verona, & E. Prandelli. (2005) “Collaborating to create: The Internet as a platform for customer engagement in product innovation,” Journal of Interactive Marketing, 19 (4), 4-17.

External links 
 Research Channel Video on VCE

Innovation
Customer communications management